Azure may refer to:

Colour
 Azure (color), a hue of blue
 Azure (heraldry)
 Shades of azure, shades and variations

Arts and media
 Azure (Art Farmer and Fritz Pauer album), 1987
 Azure (Gary Peacock and Marilyn Crispell album), 2013
 Azure (design magazine), Toronto, Ontario
 Azure (heraldry), a blue tincture on flags or coats of arms
 Azure (magazine), a periodical on Jewish thought and identity
 Azure (painting), by Gustave Van de Woestijne
 "Azure" (song), by Duke Ellington
 "Azure", a song by the 3rd and the Mortal from the album Painting on Glass

Computing
 Microsoft Azure, a cloud computing platform
 Mozilla Azure, a graphics abstraction API

Places
 Azure, Alberta, a locality in Canada
 Azure, Montana, a census-designated place in the United States
 Azure Window, a former natural arch in Malta

Other uses
 Azure Ryder (born 1996), an Australian singer, songwriter, and musician 
 Azure (barley), a malting barley variety
 Bentley Azure, a car

See also
 Lapis lazuli, a semi-precious stone, and the root of the word "azure" 
 Azur (disambiguation)
 Azura (disambiguation)